Organford is a hamlet in the county of Dorset, England. It is located just south of the A35 between Lytchett Minster and Slepe.

References 

Villages in Dorset